No One's Child (Ničije dete) is a 2014 Serbian drama film directed by Vuk Ršumović. It was one of six films shortlisted by Serbia to be their submission for the Academy Award for Best Foreign Language Film at the 88th Academy Awards, but it lost out to Enclave.

Cast 
 Denis Murić - Haris Pućurica Pućke
 Pavle Čemerikić - Zika
 Isidora Janković - Alisa
 Miloš Timotijević - Vaspitač Ilke

References

External links 

2014 drama films
Serbian drama films
Croatian drama films
Bosnian War films
Films set in Yugoslavia
Films set in Serbia
Films set in Bosnia and Herzegovina
Films set in Belgrade
Films shot in Belgrade
Films based on actual events